This is a list of alumni of Fort Street High School, Sydney, New South Wales, Australia who have attained notability in various fields. It includes alumni of the historical Fort Street Boys' High School, Fort Street Girls' High School, Fort Street Superior Public School and Fort Street Model School (or Fort Street National School), from which Fort Street Public School also descends. They are named "Fortians" in the traditions of these schools.

Politics, government and the law

 Edwin Abbott  (1878–1947), Controller-General of the Department of Trade and Customs 1933 to 1944
 Sir William Anderson, businessman, federal president (1955–1956) and federal treasurer (1956–1968) of the Liberal Party of Australia
 Edmund Barton, the first Prime Minister of Australia and a founding Justice of the High Court of Australia; (attended Fort Street for two years; later Sydney Grammar School)
 Sir Garfield Barwick, former chief justice of the High Court of Australia
 Eric Bedford, minister and member of the NSW Legislative Assembly (1968–1985)
 Charles Bennett, member of the NSW Legislative Assembly (1934–1941);
 Ivan Black, member of the NSW Legislative Assembly (1945–1962);
 Rod Blackmore, OAM, Senior Magistrate at the Children's Court of New South Wales, serving from 1978 to 1995. 
 Vicki Bourne, Senator (1990–2002);
 Arthur Bridges, Leader of the Government in the NSW Legislative Council, minister and member (1946–1968);
 Joseph Browne, member of the NSW Legislative Council (1912–1932);
 John Bryson QC, former justice of the Supreme Court of New South Wales
 Sir Joseph Carruthers, former premier of New South Wales
 Rodney Cavalier, minister and member of the NSW Legislative Assembly (1978–1988), currently chairman of the SCG Trust
 Ian Cohen, member of the NSW Legislative Council (1995–2011)
 Terence Cole, QC, jurist, twice Royal Commissioner (AWB Oil-for-Food and Building Industry)
 Hugh Connell, DSO MC and Bar, member of the NSW Legislative Assembly (1920–1934);
 Peter Crawford, member of the NSW Legislative Assembly (1984–1988);
 William Dick, member of the NSW Legislative Assembly (1894–1907) and NSW Legislative Council (1907–1932);
 Ben Doig, member of the NSW Legislative Assembly (1957–1965);
 John Dowd, former NSW Attorney-General, Leader of the Opposition and Justice of the Supreme Court of New South Wales, and former chancellor of Southern Cross University;
 Syd Einfeld, Deputy Leader of the Opposition, minister and member of the NSW Legislative Assembly (1965–1981)
 Bob Ellicott, QC, former federal minister, solicitor-general, attorney-general and judge of the Federal Court
 Sir Kevin Ellis, Speaker of the NSW Legislative Assembly and Member (1948–1973)
 Dr H. V. Evatt, former High Court judge, former Chief Justice of the Supreme Court of New South Wales, president of the United Nations General Assembly and federal ALP opposition leader
 Clive Evatt, minister and member of the NSW Legislative Assembly (1939–1959), brother of H. V. Evatt
 Doug Everingham, federal Minister for Health, 1972-1975
 David Fell, member of the NSW Legislative Assembly (1904–1913);
 Sir David Ferguson, former justice of the Supreme Court of NSW
 JD (Jack) Fitzgerald, member of the NSW Legislative Assembly (1891–1894) and NSW Legislative Council (1915–1922);
 Harry Gardiner, member of the NSW Legislative Council (1960–1974)
 Don Grimes, former senator, federal minister, and member of the Administrative Appeals Tribunal
 Arthur Grimm, member of the NSW Legislative Assembly (1913–1925);
 Graham Hill, former judge of the Federal Court of Australia
 Thomas Holden, member of the NSW Legislative Council (1934–1945);
 Justice Michael Kirby, former justice of the High Court of Australia
 Justice David Kirby, former justice of the Supreme Court of New South Wales
 Joseph Kelly, member of the NSW Legislative Assembly (1894–1898);
 Sir John Kerr, 18th Governor-General of Australia, responsible for the dismissal of the Whitlam government in 1975, former Chief Justice of the Supreme Court of New South Wales
 Hugh Latimer, member of the NSW Legislative Council (1934–1954);
 Stan Lloyd, member of the NSW Legislative Assembly(1932–1941);
 Harold Mason, member of the NSW Legislative Assembly (1937–1938);
 Gustave 'Gus' Miller, member of the NSW Legislative Assembly (1889–1918)
 Trevor Morling, QC, former judge of the Federal Court, Royal Commissioner and chairman of the Australian Electoral Commission
 William Murray, member of the NSW Legislative Council (1952–1976);
 Lerryn Mutton, member of the NSW Legislative Assembly (1968–1978);
 Shane Paltridge, politician; senator 1951-1966
 John Perry, minister and member of the NSW Legislative Assembly (1889–1920)
 Ivan Petch, member of the NSW Legislative Assembly (1988–1995);
 Dr Peter Phelps member of the NSW Legislative Council (2011-2019);
 Max Ruddock, minister and member of the NSW Legislative Assembly (1962–1976) and father of Philip Ruddock;
 James Shand, minister and member of the NSW Legislative Assembly (1926–1944);
 Simon Sheikh, former executive director of GetUp!, a national non-party political organisation
 William Shipway, member of the NSW Legislative Assembly (1894–1895);
 Ross Smith, Victorian MLA (1985–2002)
 Harold Snelling, former NSW solicitor-general
 Sir Percy Spender, former president of the International Court of Justice, Federal Minister, diplomat and jurist
 Sir Bertram Stevens, former premier of New South Wales
 Stanley Stephens, minister and member of the NSW Legislative Assembly (1944–1973);
 Sir Alan Taylor, former justice of the High Court of Australia
 Sir Frederick Tout, pastoralist and member of the NSW Legislative Council (1932–1946) and Newington College (1886–1890) where he was Captain of Rugby Union.
 Allan Viney, member of the NSW Legislative Assembly (1971–1978);
 Horace Whiddon, member of the NSW Legislative Council (1934–1955);
 Sir Robert Wilson, member of the NSW Legislative Council (1949–1961);
 Neville Wran, former premier of New South Wales.

Science and academia

 Joyce Allan, conchologist, artist and first female Fellow of the Royal Zoological Society of New South Wales
 Sir Hermann Black, former chancellor of the University of Sydney
 Carl Bridge, Professor Emeritus of Australian History, King’s College London
 Frederick Bridges, educationalist and former chief inspector of schools in New South Wales
 Ida Brown, palaentonologist, first female president of the Royal Society of New South Wales
 Hedley Bull, professor of international relations at ANU, LSE and Oxford University, and author of "The Anarchical Society"
 Persia Campbell, Australian-born American economist and consumer rights champion
 John Henry Carver, physicist
 Alan Rowland Chisholm, professor of French at University of Melbourne, critic and commentator
 Sir Archibald Collins, former president of the British Medical Association of Australia,
 Dr Robert Douglas, doctor and medical scientist
Dr William Figgett, biomedical scientist at the University of Melbourne
 Lionel Gilbert OAM, author and historian specializing in natural, applied, and local history.
 Norman Haire, medical practitioner and sexologist
 Margaret Ann Harris, Challis Professor of English Literature at The University of Sydney
 Stephen Hetherington, philosopher, Emeritus Professor in the School of Humanities and Languages at the University of New South Wales.
 Ronald Horan, educator, linguist and author
 John Irvine Hunter, biologist
 Prof Nalini Joshi, chair, National Committee for Mathematical Sciences, School of Mathematics and Statistics, The University of Sydney
Phyllis Kaberry, social anthropologist
Liang Joo Leow OAM, physician, Mohs surgeon, linguist; first dermatologist appointed to the Therapeutic Goods Administration
Sylvia Lawson- academic, writer and journalist 
 Sir Douglas Mawson, Antarctic explorer
 R. Kerry Rowe, FRS, civil engineer. Professor, Kingston University, Ontario
 Maria Skyllas-Kazacos AM, director of the University of New South Wales, Centre for Electrochemical and Mineral Processing
 Mavis Sweeney (1909 - 23 July 1986), Australian hospital pharmacist 
 Arthur Bache Walkom, palaeobotanist and museum director
 Prof John Manning Ward, former vice-chancellor at The University of Sydney
 Sir Harold Wyndham, former NSW Director-General of Education, creator of the Wyndham Scheme (HSC)
 Dr John Yu, Australian of the Year, 1996; former chancellor of UNSW
 Dr Jee Hyun Kim, senior research fellow and head of the Developmental Psychobiology Laboratory at the Florey Institute of Neuroscience and Mental Health in Melbourne

Rhodes Scholars

 Kate Brennan - BA LLB, University of Sydney, 2006 (also attended Tara Anglican School for Girls and MLC School)
 Robert Nicholson McCulloch - BSc (Agric), University of Sydney, 1926

Military
 Maj Basil Catterns, soldier, businessman and yachtsman
 Maj-Gen Bill Crews, former national president of the Returned and Services League of Australia
 Flt Lt Pat Hughes, RAAF pilot. One of The Few, Hughes was the highest-scoring Australian in the Battle of Britain
 Sqdn Ldr Guy Menzies, first solo flight over the Tasman Sea
 Arthur George Weaver DFC, bomber pilot, lawyer and father of Jacki Weaver
 Maj-Gen George Wootten, soldier, lawyer, and political activist
 Maj-Gen Zeng Sheng (Tsang Sang), Chinese guerilla force commander in Hong Kong during World War II, later officer in the Chinese army and Minister of Transport (attended Fort Street for five years, later attended Sun Yat-sen University High School)

Business and industry

 Frank Albert, founder of Albert Music and the board of the Australian Broadcasting Company
 Hughie Armitage, former governor of the Commonwealth Bank
 Samuel Hordern, merchant and philanthropist
 Sir Ronald Irish, businessman and author;
 Raymond McGrath, architect, pioneer of Modernism, former president of the Royal Hibernian Academy 
 Gary Pemberton, businessman
 Abe Saffron, underworld figure, nightclub owner and property developer
 John Singleton, broadcaster; advertising tycoon
 Ken Thomas, founder of Thomas Nationwide Transport, international transport company.

Religion and community
 Ellis Gowing former Archdeacon of Southend, United Kingdom 
 Stephen Duckett, secretary of Commonwealth Department of Health (1994–1996), chair, board of directors, Brotherhood of St Laurence (2000–2005), president and chief executive officer, Alberta Health Services (2009–2010), Health Program Director, Grattan Institute (2012 -)
 Tony Thirlwell OAM, chief executive, Heart Foundation (NSW)
 Sir Alan Walker, former superintendent minister of the Wesley Central Mission, Central Methodist Mission Sydney
 James Graham Somerville, environmentalist

Entertainment, media and the arts

 Neville Amadio, flautist
 John Appleton, stage and radio actor writer and producer
 Helmut Bakaitis, actor
 George Lewis Becke, writer
 Bill Boustead, conservator at the Art Gallery of New South Wales from 1954 until 1977.
 Barbara Brunton actress
 Christian Byers, actor
 Anna Choy, television presenter
 Kenneth Cook, writer
 David Foster, novelist, essayist, poet and farmer (also attended Orange High School and Armidale High School)
 Nikki Gooley, make-up artist, BAFTA winner (2005), Saturn Award winner (1999), Oscar nominee (2006)
 Norman Hetherington, creator of "Mr. Squiggle"
 Frank Hodgkinson AM, Australian printmaker, painter and graphic artist
 A. D. Hope, poet
 Muriel Howlett, first female journalist for the BBC
 Lindy Hume, opera and festival director
 Deborah Hutton, Model & TV Personality
 Dr Francis James, journalist and publisher
 Sir Errol Knox, journalist, publisher, citizen soldier who served in both world wars rising to the rank of brigadier
 Mary Kostakidis, SBS newsreader and a member of founding management team
Liang Joo Leow OAM, voice artist
 James McAuley, poet and co-creator of Ern Malley
Cassie McCullagh, ABC presenter, journalist and writer  
Donald McDonald, former chairman of the Australian Broadcasting Corporation
 Adit Gauchan, producer for Australian hip hop band Horrorshow
 Nick Bryant-Smith (MC Solo), rapper for Australian hip hop band Horrorshow
 Nick Lupi, rapper for hip hop group Spit Syndicate
 Tai Nguyen, actor
 Kaho Cheung (aka Unkle Ho), producer for Australian hip hop band The Herd
 Lucia Osborne-Crowley, author of 'I Choose Elena' and journalist
 Michael Pate, Australian actor and writer
 Robie Porter, (aka Rob E G), Australian musician and music producer
 Margaret Preston, artist and teacher of art
 Josh Pyke, singer/songwriting musician
 Eric Charles Rolls AM, Writer; Recipient of the Centenary Medal 2003
 Dennis Shanahan, political editor, The Australian
 Joy Smithers, actress and public speaker
 Harold Stewart, poet and co-creator of Ern Malley
 John West, ABC radio's "The Showman"
 Amy Witting, poet and novelist
 Rowan Woods, AFI winning film director
 Josh Szeps, political satirist and TV show host
Jake Stone, singer of Indie rock band Bluejuice, along with others in the band

Sport

 Marilyn Black, athlete, 1964 Summer Olympics
 Judy Canty, athlete, 1948 Olympic Games, 1950 British Empire Games
 Jean Coleman, athlete, 1938 Empire Games
 Robert Graves, dual Rugby international
 Harold Hardwick, swimmer, 1911 Empire Games; 1912 Olympic Games
 Jon Henricks, swimmer, 1954 British Empire and Commonwealth Games; 1956, 1960 Olympic Games
 Harry Hopman, tennis player
 Clarice Kennedy, athlete, 1938 Empire Games
 Garry Leo, Rugby League, 1963–74, Balmain Tigers First Grade
 Adrian Lowe, athlete, 1988 Paralympic Games.
 Charles Macartney, cricketer
 Betty McKinnon, athlete, 1948 Olympic Games
 Paul Magee, athlete, 1938 Empire Games
 June Maston, athlete, 1948 Olympic Games
 Marlene Matthews, athlete, 1954, 1958 British Empire and Commonwealth Games; 1956, 1960 Olympic Games; later director of the Western Sydney Academy of Sport
 Wayne Miranda, Rugby League, 1979–83, Balmain Rugby League First Grade
 Ian Moutray, Rugby Union international
 Margaret Parker, athlete, 1966 British Empire and Commonwealth Games
 Myer Rosenblum, athlete, 1938 British empire and Commonwealth Games; and Rugby Union international
 Frederick (Frank) Row, Australia's first Rugby Union captain (vs British Lions, 1899)
 Fred Spofforth, cricketer
 Jan Stephenson, golfer
 Liz Weekes, water polo, 2000 Olympic Games
 Taryn Woods, water polo, 2000 Olympic Games

References

External links
 Distinguished Fortians, 2018. (167-page alphabetic list of FSHS student alumni.)
 Foreword by Justice Kirby in the sesquicentenary book, Maroon and Silver (1999)

Fort Street
Fort Street